The Goldfields Titans was a semi professional rugby league club based in Kalgoorlie-Boulder, Western Australia, Australia. They compete in the Western Australia Rugby League's Harvey Norman Cup first grade competition and home games are played at the Goldfields Oasis Playing Fields.

The Titans are the most isolated rugby league club in the world, having to travel over 1400 km to away fixtures in Perth and Bunbury, Western Australia.

Goldfields Titans have a major sponsorship deal with local mining company Paddington Gold Mine.

History
Goldfields Titans Rugby League Football Club is part of the Western Australian Rugby League Tooheys Cup Competition. Playing out of the Goldfields, situated 595 km east of Perth, we believe that this is the only team in Australia who travel 17 hrs to participate in the WARL Tooheys Cup Competition in Perth.

On 18 August 1995, the Goldfields clashed with the best players from W.A's iron ore region as a curtain raiser to the ARL fixture between the Western Reds and Newcastle. During the past five years, Goldfields has taken on Pilbara, Newman, New South Wales Country and several leading metropolitan sides in similar challenge matches and emerged victorious in each.

The Goldfields Titans home ground will be located at the Oasis Playing Fields next to the Goldfields Oasis Leisure Centre.

2012 Squad
2012 Tooheys Cup Squad
Tony Apanui
Junior Avei
Tukere Barlow
Tim Desmond
Shemaiah Evans
Ramon Hare
Drew Hunt
Rongo Keene
Santana Leach
Adam Love
Christopher Luckett
Chris McGivern
Gavin Moana
Matthew Murray
Aaron Owen
Walter Paekau
Hunta Pohutuhutu
Tyrone Ruataka
Andrew Saltmarsh
Jamie Schuster
Kris Sheehan
Wiremu Stothers
Howard Tamaki
Shane Tangipo
Jason Taylor
Kuraau Temata

2012 Fixtures
2012 WARL Harvey Norman Premiership

Sponsors
The Goldfields Titans gratefully acknowledge our generous sponsors...

A-Z Panel & Paint
Bank of Queensland
BP Petroleum
City of Kalgoorlie-Boulder
Canterbury Clothing
Cash Converters
DPS
Elastoplast
EM Kebabs
Gan Eden Landscapes
Golden City Motors
Golden Mile Computers
Guardian Pharmacy
Harvey Norman
IGA
Instant Windscreens
Kalgoorlie Miner
La Mancha
Lion Nathan
McDonald's
National Tyres
Paddington Gold
Powerplay Sports
Resources Trading Hub
Rydges Kalgoorlie
Snap Printing
SportsPower
Thrifty
Vissign
Wades Real Estate
YMCA

Notable juniors
 Royce Hunt (2017- Canberra Raiders)

Articles
Thumbs up for Titans
Gruelling Travel Schedule

See also

Western Australia Rugby League
WA Reds

References

Sources
Kalgoorlie Miner
Western Australian Rugby League
The West Australian

External links
Official Goldfields Titans website
Western Australian Rugby League
Official WA Reds
Goldfields Touch Association

Rugby league teams in Western Australia
2009 establishments in Australia
Rugby clubs established in 2009